Ostoni is a manufacturer of plants, machines, dyes, accessories and spare parts used in pasta production operations.  The company produces, refurbishes and sells new and second-hand equipment worldwide and is known especially for its machines for filled products (such as ravioli, cappelletti, tortelloni, tortellini and pelmeni).  Ostoni began manufacturing pasta machines in 1958, in Milan, Italy, and has opened another workshop in Romania in 2006.

References

 Ostoni Official Website

Food and drink companies of Italy
Manufacturing companies of Italy
Companies based in Lombardy
Metropolitan City of Milan